Stuart C. Gilson is an American economist currently the Steven R. Fenster Professor of Business Administration at Harvard Business School.

References

Year of birth missing (living people)
Living people
Harvard Business School faculty
American economists
University of Manitoba alumni
University of British Columbia alumni